Methyl anisate is the methyl ester of p-anisic acid. It is found in star anise.

It is an organic compound commonly used within the food industry. It is also commonly employed as a fragrance for certain perfumes. This compound can be synthesized directly through the mixture of methanol and methoxybenzoic acid. Its type of odor is characteristic to that of feijoa tree fruits, a flowery odour.

References

External links
 Methyl benzoate at PubChem

Methyl esters
Benzoate esters